Axalphorn (locally, Axalphoren) is a peak of the Bernese Oberland, at an altitude of .
The summit is on the municipal border between Brienz and Brienzwiler.
The Axalp ski resort is on the northern slope of Axalphorn. 
On the Axalphorn ridge, west of the summit, is the Axalp-Ebenfluh installation of the Swiss Air Force. Installed in 1942, it is the site of the yearly live fire demonstration.

References

See also
Axalp
Fliegerschiessen Axalp
Wildgärst

Mountains of the Alps
Mountains of Switzerland
Mountains of the canton of Bern
Brienz
Brienzwiler
Two-thousanders of Switzerland